Holdrege station is a historic train station in Holdrege, Nebraska. It is currently served by Amtrak, the national railroad passenger system, and is served daily by Amtrak's California Zephyr.  It was originally opened in February 1911 by the Chicago, Burlington and Quincy Railroad as the CB&Q Holdrege Depot, and has been listed on the National Register of Historic Places since February 21, 1997.

Passenger service to the station ended in July 2020, owing to Americans with Disabilities Act concerns not being addressed by the building's owner. Amtrak constructed a new platform  to the east and resumed service that October. The new station area is planned to be expanded in 2021.

References

External links 

Holdrege Amtrak Station (USA RailGuide -- TrainWeb)

Amtrak stations in Nebraska
Buildings and structures in Phelps County, Nebraska
Former Chicago, Burlington and Quincy Railroad stations
Railway stations in the United States opened in 1910
Railway stations on the National Register of Historic Places in Nebraska
National Register of Historic Places in Phelps County, Nebraska
1910 establishments in Nebraska